The DR-7, also known as the Santo Domingo-Samana Highway or simply Samana Highway, is the newest addition to the Dominican Republic national highway system.

Route description
The highway starts with the Autopista Las Américas DR-3 (30 km east of Santo Domingo) and ends at the intersection Cruce Rincón de Molinillos, Samaná Province. There are three different toll booths: the first one 300 metres after the southern start of the highway; the second one at km marker 16; and the third one was built in La Reforma, right before Samaná and the Cruce Rincón de Molinillos intersection.

History
The actual construction of the rural highway started in the 2005 by the Secretary of Public Works and Communication (Secretaria de Publicas y Comunicación, SEOPC). In November 2007 the highway started final paving, since the landscape is difficult and the financing has been a major issue for the project and had stalled on several occasions thus delaying the project. It was finished by early February 2008. The new highway opened on June 1, 2009, and stretches 106 kilometers at a cost of US$150 million.
It passes the city of Monte Plata, Bayaguana and the Los Haitises National Park and 12 bridges had to be built to cross difficult terrain and rivers. Each lane is 3.65 metres wide and there's a hard shoulder for emergency stops. The total width of the 2 lanes and the hard shoulder on each side is 8 metres.

The construction of this new rural highway was done through private financing which is to be paid with tolls from RD$350.00  up to RD$700.00 each way. Even though this is much more expensive than most other highway tolls in the Dominican Republic, it is more economical compared to the old route because less time is spent and less gas needed. On top one can circumvent the very dangerous rural highway from the highway DR-1 near Bonao via San Francisco de Macoris to Samaná, which is one of the most deadly rural highways in the Dominican Republic.

The new two lane toll based highway is expected to convert Samaná to another thriving tourist hub and it makes the Los Haitises National Park much more accessible to the general public. The highway reduced the time a trip from Santo Domingo to the Samaná region took from 4 hours and 30 minutes to now less than 2 hours. The highway is expected to reduce the traffic along the DR-1 which was the only highway connecting Santo Domingo to Samana.

See also
Highways and Routes in the Dominican Republic

External links
 Diario Libre (span.) information on the project

References

Highways and routes in the Dominican Republic